The Norwegian Railway Authority is a Norwegian government agency responsible for practical control and supervision of rail transport in Norway, including railways, tramways, rapid transits, heritage railways and side tracks.

The agency was created on October 1, 1996 when the function was removed from the Norwegian State Railways.  The inspectorate is subordinate to the Norwegian Ministry of Transport and Communications and is located in Oslo.

The Norwegian Railway Authority directs its efforts towards ensuring that rail traffic, cableways, fairgrounds and technical devices in amusement parks is operated in a safe and appropriate manner in the best interests of passengers/users, companies, employees and the general public.

The Authority is responsible for ensuring that rail operators meet the conditions and requirements set out in rail legislation that governs the traffic. The authority is also responsible for drawing up regulations, awarding licences for rail activity and approving rolling stock and infrastructure.

External links 
 Norwegian Railway Inspectorate

Railway Inspectorate
Government railway authorities of Norway
Government agencies established in 1996
1996 establishments in Norway
Ministry of Transport (Norway)